The New York Underground Film Festival was an annual event that occurred each March at Anthology Film Archives in New York City from 1994 through 2008 founded by filmmakers Todd Phillips (Road Trip, Old School) and Andrew Gurland. After Phillips and Gurland turned the festival over to programmer Ed Halter, it became noted for documentary and experimental film programming, and occasionally courted controversy, particularly in its early years.

Some of these have included: premiering the North American Man/Boy Love Association (NAMBLA) documentary, Chicken Hawk: Men Who Love Boys, in 1994; premiering a film in 1995 that accused Quentin Tarantino of plagiarism; being protested by Reverend Fred Phelps in 2002 (apparently for not choosing to show a film about Phelps); and premiering a theatrical version of Brad Neely's Harry Potter parody Wizard People, Dear Reader, which eventually led to action by Warner Brothers to suppress future theatrical performances of the work.

Nevertheless, though the festival has remained a small affair, and has little value as a market, its programming has attained a certain prestige, especially among younger or more experimental filmmakers.  The first year showcased the work of Independent Animator Bill Plympton.  The New York Times described the event " as a collection of love and independence".

In February 2008 the festival organizers announced that, instead of passing on the torch to a younger generation - as has been the tradition, the 15th festival would be the last. Instead two of the former organizers intend to create a new festival under the name Migrating Forms (taking the name from a film by James Fotopoulos).

List of films shown
 15th festival, April 2–8, 2008
 14th festival, March 28 - April 3, 2007
 13th festival, March 8–14, 2006
 12th festival, March 9–15, 2005
 11th festival, March 10–16, 2004
 10th festival, March 5–11, 2003
 9th festival, March 6–12, 2002
 8th festival, March 7–13, 2001
 7th festival, March 8–14, 2000
 6th festival, March 10–14, 1999
 5th festival, March 18–22, 1998
 4th festival, March 19–23, 1997
 3rd festival, March 20–24, 1996

References and links

 Official website for the New York Underground Film Festival 
 Official website for Migrating Forms
 indieWIRE article on 10th NYUFF
 Festival Review: Mining Gold at the New York Underground
 Village Voice article on Fred Phelps protest
 Official site for Mike White
 Illegal Art site for Wizard People, Dear Readers (with further links)

 
Experimental film festivals
Underground Film
Underground film festivals